The South Australian Railways 700 class was a class of 2-8-2 steam locomotives operated by the South Australian Railways.

History
As part of William Webb's rehabilitation of the South Australian Railways, ten 2-8-2 steam locomotives were delivered by Armstrong Whitworth, Newcastle upon Tyne in March 1926. They were designed to operate across all broad gauge branch lines. In 1928, they were followed by ten nearly identical 710 class locomotives built at Islington Railway Workshops. Coal shortages after World War II saw a number converted to burn oil. All were later converted back to coal burners. The first two were withdrawn in June 1959 with the remainder replaced as 830 diesel locomotives entered service. The last was withdrawn in June 1968.

The National Railway Museum, Port Adelaide has preserved 702.

References

External links

Armstrong Whitworth locomotives
Railway locomotives introduced in 1926
700
2-8-2 locomotives
Broad gauge locomotives in Australia
Freight locomotives